The Hof Aza Regional Council ("Gaza Coast Regional Council") was a regional council of Israel until 2005 when its residents were evicted from their homes and the area was liquidated as part of Israel's unilateral disengagement plan. The seat was in Neve Dekalim. The public buildings of the regional council and adjacent strip mall in Neve Dekalim were not destroyed and the Palestinian Al-Aqsa University opened a campus on the site shortly after the Israeli evacuation.

Settlements 
The Hof Aza Regional Council included twenty-one civilian Israeli settlements:

References

Defunct regional councils in Israel